The women's sanda 60 kilograms competition at the 2014 Asian Games in Incheon, South Korea was held from 20 September to 24 September at the Ganghwa Dolmens Gymnasium.

Sanda is an unsanctioned fight is a Chinese self-defense system and combat sport. Amateur Sanda allows kicks, punches, knees (not to the head), and throws.

A total of eleven competitors from eleven different countries competed in this event, limited to fighters whose body weight was less than 60 kilograms.

Wang Cong from China won the gold medal after beating Kao Yu-chuan of Chinese Taipei in gold medal bout 2–0, Wang won both periods by the same score of 5–0. The bronze medal was shared by Tân Thị Ly from Vietnam and Jennet Aýnazarowa of Turkmenistan. Rukhsana Hanif from Pakistan, Shahrbanoo Mansourian from Iran, Song Seon-yeong from South Korea and Chahana Bomjan Lama from Nepal shared the fifth place. Athletes from India, Mongolia and Bangladesh lost in the first round and didn't advance.

Schedule
All times are Korea Standard Time (UTC+09:00)

Results
Legend
TV — Technical victory

References

External links
Official website

Women's sanda 60 kg